Carmelo Abela (born 10 February 1972) is a Maltese politician and is serving as an incumbent Labour MP and was the Minister for Home Affairs and National Security. He also served as Minister for Foreign Affairs and Trade Promotion. and as Deputy Speaker of the House of Representatives of Malta. On 15 January 2020 he was appointed as Minister within the OPM in Robert Abela's cabinet.

Biography
Carmelo Abela was born on 10 February 1972 in Malta.

He won his first general election in 1996, when he was named to the 8th Parliament of Malta. He has since won in 1998, 2003, 2008, and 2013. He was elected Deputy Speaker of the Tenth Parliament on 6 March 2003 and re-appointed on 5 October 2008, resigning as speaker on 5 July 2010.

He has served as Government Whip in the Malta Legislature.

In December 2014, he became Minister for Home Affairs and National Security. As Home Affairs Minister, in January 2017 he stated that the government had “no plans” to extend Maltese citizenship to children born in Malta with migrant parents. Prior to 2001, all children born in Malta were entitled to citizenship, with the law changed to apply to only those born before 1989 in 2001. On 8 June 2017 he was elected Minister of Foreign Affairs and Trade Promotion.

Personal life
He and his wife Melanie have two children.

See also

List of current foreign ministers
List of foreign ministers in 2017
List of Ministers for Home Affairs of Malta

References

External links

Official Website

|-

1972 births
Labour Party (Malta) politicians
Living people
Maltese Roman Catholics
Members of the House of Representatives of Malta
Foreign ministers of Malta
Interior ministers of Malta
Trade ministers of Malta
20th-century Maltese politicians
21st-century Maltese politicians